Cedar Fork may refer to:

Cedar Fork (Boeuf Creek), a stream in Missouri
Cedar Fork, Virginia, an unincorporated community